In road transport, an oversize load (or overweight load) is a load that exceeds the standard or ordinary legal size and/or weight limits for a truck to convey on a specified portion of road, highway, or other transport infrastructure, such as air freight or water freight. In Europe, it may be referred to as special transport or heavy and oversized transportation. There may also be load-per-axle limits. However, a load that exceeds the per-axle limits but not the overall weight limits is considered overweight. Examples of oversize/overweight loads include construction machines (cranes, front loaders, backhoes, etc.), pre-built homes, containers, and construction elements (bridge beams, generators, windmill propellers, rocket stages, and industrial equipment).

Overview

The legal dimensions and weights vary between countries and regions within a country. A vehicle which exceeds the legal dimensions usually requires a special permit which requires extra fees to be paid in order for the oversize/overweight vehicle to legally travel on the roadways. The permit usually specifies a route the load must follow as well as the dates and times during which the load may travel.

When a load cannot be dismantled into units that can be transported without exceeding the limitations in terms of the dimensions and/or mass, it is classified as an abnormal load. Another definition can be summarized as follows: an abnormal indivisible load ('AIL') is one which cannot be divided into two or more loads for transporting (on roads). Also, break bulk is used to define the freight that cannot be loaded into any ocean container or too large for air cargo.

Any road transport is framed by the CMR Convention (Convention on the Contract for the International Carriage of Goods by Road), which relates to various legal issues concerning transportation of cargo, predominantly by lorries, by road.

Cargo loading and securement
According to the Federal Motor Carrier Safety Administration, National Highway Traffic Safety Administration, Large Truck Crash Causation Study 7% of U.S. trucking accidents are caused by improper cargo securement or cargo shifts. Shifting cargo can cause the truck to destabilize or the load can fall off completely leading to serious public safety issues.

Load shifting is prohibited by law and it is the responsibility of the shipper, motor carrier, driver, receiver, and the securing device manufacturer to ensure the cargo is completely secured.

International perspectives

In a specific country, the roads are built in a way that allows a vehicle with dimensions within the standard legal limits to safely (though not necessarily easily) drive and turn. Roads that do not allow large vehicles may be marked with the traffic signs. These may include per-axle load, height, width, or overall length limits.

Europe
Trucks must have special signs of "convoi exceptionnel" and lights that warn the oversized cargo. The escort car has also special signs, depending the country within it operates. Special permits are issued by local authorities to allow a transporter to operate on a public road for a limited period and for a certain and given route.

Heavy transport companies tend to focus on renewables, civil and infrastructure, offshore, oil and gas, heavy engineering and power generation industries. Other companies across Europe have also collaborated to form the Route To Space Alliance.

The Netherlands
Due to its strategic location, there are many Dutch-based special transport companies, but due to the relatively small size of the country, these companies, such as Van der Vlist have often started to spread further afield to increase their market and take advantage of the freedom of movement offered through the EU.

Romania
In Romania, if the total dimensions (truck+load) exceed  ×  (or if it does not fit into a tilt truck), then a transport is considered out of gauge. A table of maximum dimensions and weight as well as best practices is available for European countries on the following industry resource site.

Romania has an active market for special transporters where, as mentioned above, companies such as Schnell Trans, deal with international transportation projects. Trailers suitable for special loads have different characteristics depending on the number of axles, height from the ground to the platform, extensions or load capacity. Each of these trucks can carry loads such as trams, energy transformers, construction machines, metallic structures or wooden boxes/crates.

United Kingdom

An abnormal load is defined as
a load with a weight of more than 44 tonnes
an axle load of more than 10 tonnes for a single non-driving axle and 11.5 tonnes for a single driving axle
a width of more than 2.9 metres
a rigid length of more than 18.65 metres

Anyone wishing to transport an abnormal load must notify the police, highway authorities and any on-route bridge and structure owners such as Network Rail. Highways England operates a system known as "Electronic Service Delivery for Abnormal Loads" (ESDAL) for the purpose of supporting notifications.

New Zealand

Loads must be indivisible, except when the vehicle is oversize itself where it can carry divisible loads as long as the divisible load fits within the standard load limits.

United States
In many states, a load must be considered "nondivisible" to qualify for a permit (i.e. an object which cannot be broken down into smaller pieces), although some states allow divisible loads to be granted permits.

Signaling

A pilot car driver may temporarily block traffic at intersections to ensure the safe passage of the truck.

Hazards

Oversize loads present a hazard to roadway structures as well as to road traffic. Because they exceed design clearances, there is a risk that such vehicles can hit bridges and other overhead structures. Over-height vehicle impacts are a frequent cause of damage to bridges, and truss bridges are particularly vulnerable, due to having critical support members over the roadway. An over-height load struck the overhead beams on the I-5 Skagit River bridge in 2013, which caused the bridge to collapse.

Licensing
Different countries have different approaches to licensing oversize/overweight loads. Licenses may be issued for a specific load, for a period of time, or to a specific company. In most jurisdictions, the permit specifies the exact route a vehicle must take, and includes clearance warnings. However, in some places, such as Washington state, drivers are responsible for choosing their own route. The carrier can choose to obtain the required permits themselves or go through a permit service.

See also

 Loading gauge
 Structure gauge
 Trucking industry in the United States
 Maritime shipping Roll trailer

References

External links
 U.S. Government website

road hazards
road transport
road transport in Europe
transport by cargo
Freight transport